The Small Cowper Madonna is a painting by the Italian High Renaissance artist Raphael, depicting Mary and Child, in a typical Italian countryside. It has been dated to around 1504–1505, the middle of the High Renaissance.

Story
It is not known exactly why the Small Cowper Madonna was painted. It was probably either a private commission  or for the general art market; images of the Madonna and Child were often given as wedding presents. It is widely thought that the church on the right hand side of the painting is the church of San Bernardino, where the Dukes of Urbino (where Raphael was born) were buried, and it has been suggested that the presence of the church means the painting may have been "commissioned by the family for devotional purposes." At the same time, it could just be Raphael drawing on memories of the church, which would have been near where he grew up in Urbino.

Description
Sitting in the center of the work in a bright red dress is the Madonna. She is fair skinned with blonde hair. She sits comfortably on a wooden bench. Across her lap is a dark drapery upon which her right hand delicately sits. There appears to be a sheer translucent ribbon elegantly flowing across the top of her dress and behind her head. The faintest golden halo miraculously surrounds her head. In her left hand she holds the baby Christ, who embraces her with one arm around her back, the other around her neck. He, an undeniably precious child, looks back over his shoulder with a coy smile. Behind them, a beautifully clear and bright day unfolds. Off in the distance two figures appear to be ambling toward a reflective pond, enjoying the green scenery around them. A large and very impressing structure stands at the end of a long path, which one could presume to be a Catholic church. Its dome and other structural elements common of Catholic architecture add to the already omnipresent atmosphere of religious divinity and grace.

2015 Exhibition
In 2015 the National Gallery of Art loaned the Small Cowper Madonna to the Worcester Art Museum in Massachusetts (U.S.) to be exhibited alongside The Virgin and Child (The Northbrook Madonna). The Northbrook Madonna is in the Worcester Art Museum's  permanent collection and was once attributed to Raphael. One hope of the exhibition was to identify the artist who painted the Northbrook Madonna. The painter of the Northbrook Madonna was later identified by the museum as perhaps being Domenico Alfani, a close friend of Raphael's whose works have often been misattributed to the better-known artist.

See also
Niccolini-Cowper Madonna

References

External links 
The Small Cowper Madonna
Report of 1913 sale to wealthy Americans

Paintings of the Madonna and Child by Raphael
1505 paintings
Collections of the National Gallery of Art
Nude art